The Irish state has officially approved the following List of National Monuments of Ireland. In the Republic of Ireland, a structure or site may be deemed to be a "National Monument", and therefore worthy of state protection, if it is of national importance. If the land adjoining the monument is essential to protect it, this land may also be protected.

Only National Monuments in Counties Donegal, Cavan and Monaghan are under the protection of the Irish Government as the rest of Ulster is part of Northern Ireland. In Northern Ireland, such monuments are usually termed scheduled monuments and are under the protection of the Department for Communities, a department created by the Northern Ireland Executive in April 2016. Previously, such monuments were under the protection of the Northern Ireland Environment Agency (N.I.E.A.), which was part of the former Department of the Environment (the D.o.E.).

National Monuments in Ulster 

 This list is initially sorted by county. If the list is sorted under another heading, the county links above will take you to the first item from the county in the sorted list

|}

See also 

National Monument (Ireland)

References 

 National Monuments Service: Search By County. Retrieved 29 July 2010.

Archaeological sites in the Republic of Ireland
Monuments and memorials in the Republic of Ireland
Heritage registers in the Republic of Ireland